Timeline of anthropology, 2010–2019

Events
2013
Discovery of Homo naledi  an extinct species of hominin, found in the Dinaledi Chamber of the Rising Star Cave system in South Africa's Gauteng province
2015
Announcement of the discovery of Homo naledi made

Births

Deaths

2011 
 Lewis Binford (April 11) (archaeologist)
 Carlos Iván Degregori (May 18)
 Edmund Snow Carpenter (July 1) 
 Allen R. Maxwell (November 16)
 Marc Swartz (December 14)

2012 
 Elizabeth Brumfiel (January 1)
 Steven Rubenstein (March 8)
 Dennison J. Nash (March 20) 
 Neil L. Whitehead (March 22)
 Phillip V. Tobias (June 7)
 Michel-Rolph Trouillot (July 5) 
 Anna Lou Dehavenon

2013 
 Masao Yamaguchi

Publications
 David Graeber, Debt: The First 5000 Years (2011)
 Tim Ingold, Being Alive: Essays on Movement, Knowledge and Description (2011)
 Christoph Antweiler, Inclusive Humanism: Anthropological Basics for a Realistic Cosmopolitanism (2011)
 Angela Davis, The Meaning of Freedom: And Other Difficult Dialogues  (2012)

Awards

References

Anthropology by decade
Anthropology 
Anthropology timelines
Anthropology